'Decon is a New York-based creative studio that houses production, creative, strategy, and music divisions. The company creates campaigns on behalf of brands and advertising agencies.

History 
Originally named Deconstruction Company, the company was founded in 2002 by Peter Bittenbender and Jason Goldwatch after the creation of their award-winning hip-hop documentary and accompanying soundtrack, One Big Trip. The soundtrack was then released as a double-sided DVD/CD in 2002 with Hieroglyphic Imperium Records - it is thought to be the first hip-hop-centric release in the hybrid format.

In 2012, Decon earned a Promax Award for work on NBCUniversal's "Green Week" campaign. That year, Misha Louy and Sacha Jenkins both joined as partners, expanding the Production and Entertainment divisions.

Decon Records
Decon Records is an independent record label that is a division of Decon. It got its start releasing underground hip-hop recordings. It was established in 2003. In 2013, Decon Records was noted as one of Billboard’s 50 Best Independent Labels in America.  Decon Records began by collaborating with the west coast collective Project Blowed to release projects from Aceyalone of the Freestyle Fellowship, such as Love & Hate which features production from El-P and RJD2. Other early Decon Records projects include partnering with The Roots to establish Okayplayer Records.
The label provided further releases from Aceyalone as well as RJD2’s Magnificent City Instrumentals (2006) and Evidence's Red Tape Instrumentals (2007).
In 2008, the label released an album from frequent Talib Kweli and Mos Def collaborator, 88-Keys, called The Death of Adam. The album featured Kid Cudi and Redman and was executive produced by Kanye West.  The video for the lead single “Stay Up! (Viagra)” was directed by Decon co-founder Jason Goldwatch and premiered on MTV.

The following year, Decon licensed RJD2’s “A Beautiful Mine” as the theme song for the AMC show Mad Men.  That year, Decon released Jay Electronica's Just Blaze-produced tracks "Exhibit A" and "Exhibit C". While collaborating with Decon Records, Jay won two awards from MTV and signed a deal with Roc Nation.

The Alchemist’s Russian Roulette, Gangrene’s Vodka & Ayahuasca, and Roc Marciano’s Reloaded all made the HipHopDX 2012 records of the year awards list., and were favorably reviewed in Complex Magazine.  XXL singled out Roc Marciano’s Decon Records release, Reloaded, as the “Best Slept-On Album” of that year.
Early album releases saw Decon working alongside Project Blowed and Okayplayer. In 2011, Decon earned recognition from Billboard as one of the 50 Best Indie Labels in America.

Roster 

 88-Keys
 Aaron Cohen
 Aceyalone
 Alexander Spit
 Black Milk
 Chali 2na
 Classified
 Dan the Automator
 Del the Funky Homosapien
 Dilated Peoples
 DJ Z-Trip
 Ellay Khule
 Evidence
 Freddie Gibbs
 Freestyle Fellowship
 Gangrene
 Goapele
 Haiku D'Etat

 Hieroglyphics
 Jurassic 5
 Lyrics Born
 Ninjasonik
 Nneka
 Plantlife
 Pusha T
 Rakaa
 RJD2
 Roc Marciano
 Shad
 The Alchemist
 The A-Team
 The Good Brothers
 The Hood Internet
 Wax Tailor
 Zion I

Selected discography

2003 
 The Good Brothers - Project Blowed Presents: The Good Brothers
 Aceyalone - Moonlit Skies
 Aceyalone - Love & Hate

2004 
 Haiku D'Etat - Coup De Theatre
 Haiku D'Etat - Haiku D'Etat
 Various Artists - True Notes Vol. 1 REISSUE
 Aceyalone - All Balls Don't Bounce - Revisited

2005 
 Various Artists - 2K6: The Tracks
 Ellay Khule - Califormula
 Lyrics Born - Big Money Talk
 Afu-Ra - State Of The Arts
 Various Artists - Cali Comm 2004
 Various Artists - Project Blowed: 10th Anniversary
 Various Artists - Who The F*ck Is You

2006 
 Dan The Automator - 2K7 Instrumentals
 Dan The Automator - 2K7
 Aceyalone & Abstract Rude - Who Reframed The A-Team
 RJD2 - Magnificent City Instrumentals
 Aceyalone - Grand Imperial
 Aceyalone - Supahero
 Afu-Ra - God Of Rap
 Aceyalone - Magnificent City

2007 
 Aceyalone - Lightning Strikes
 Dilated Peoples - The Release Party
 Z-Trip - All Pro
 Evidence - Red Tape Instrumentals
 The Alchemist - Rapper's Best Friend

2008 
 Jurassic 5 - Jurassic 5 (Deluxe) REISSUE
 88-Keys - The Death of Adam
 Various Artists - Fresh Rhymes & Videotape
 88-Keys - Stay Up! (Viagra) ft. Kanye West (Single)
 Plantlife - Time Traveller
 Kenny Segal - Ken Can Cook

2009 
 Various Artists - Never Not Fresh
 Jay Electronica - Exhibit C
 Nneka - The Uncomfortable Truth
 Chali 2na - Fish Outta Water
 Jay Electronica - Exhibit A
 Aceyalone - Aceyalone and the Lonely Ones
 Evidence - The Layover

2010 
 Gangrene - Sawblade EP
 Lyrics Born - As U Were
 Gangrene - Gutter Water
 Freddie Gibbs - Str8 Killa EP
 Rakaa - Crown Of Thorns
 Chali 2na - Fish Market 2
 Aceyalone - Hip Hop And The World We Live In REISSUE
 Aceyalone - Accepted Eclectic REISSUE
 Nneka - Concrete Jungle

2011 
 Freestyle Fellowship - The Promise
 Blended Babies - Shooter McGavin
 Goapele - Break Of Dawn
 Goapele - Play (Single)
 Roc Marciano - Greneberg EP
 Roc Marciano - Greneberg EP Instrumentals
 Pusha T - Trouble On My Mind (Single)
 Ryan Leslie - Glory (Single)
 Classified - Handshakes and Middle Fingers
 Pusha T - My God (Single)
 Various Artists - Closed Sessions: ATX
 Nneka - Soul Is Heavy
 Various Artists - One Big Trip REISSUE

2012 
 Goapele - Break Of Dawn (Deluxe)
 Roc Marciano - Reloaded
 The Hood Internet - FEAT
 Ninjasonik - Red Cups (Single)
 Lyrics Born - As U Were (Remixes)
 The Alchemist - Russian Roulette
 The Alchemist - Flight Confirmation (Single)
 Gangrene - Odditorium
 Roc Marciano - Emeralds (Single)
 The Alchemist - Rapper's Best Friend 2
 Gangrene - Vodka & Ayahuasca

2013 
 Evidence - Green Tape Instrumentals
 Aceyalone - Leanin' On Slick
 Boldy James - Grand Quarters
 Notes to Self - Target Market [RECOIL]
 Alexander Spit - A Breathtaking Trip To That Otherside
 The Hood Internet - FEAT Remixes

 Aaron Cohen- Potential Fans

See also
List of advertising agencies
List of record labels

References

External links

American record labels
Record labels established in 2004
Hip hop record labels
Companies based in New York City